The Truthful Liar is a lost 1922 American mystery silent film directed by Thomas N. Heffron and written by Percy Heath and Will J. Payne. The film stars Wanda Hawley, Guy Edward Hearn, Charles A. Stevenson, Casson Ferguson, Lloyd Whitlock, George Siegmann, and E. Alyn Warren. The film was released on April 23, 1922, by Paramount Pictures.

Plot
As described in a film magazine, Tess Haggard (Hawley) plunges Arthur Sinclair (Ferguson) into despair after she marries the sturdy David Haggard (Hearn), a rising engineer. While her husband is away on "location," she visits an illegal gambling house with Arthur and other friends. While there the place is first robbed by crooks and then raided by the police, and she loses her rings, lies to her husband but is detected, writes a silly letter and is blackmailed, and is briefly charged with murder. Her troubles are resolved when a Peteer Vanetti (Warren) confesses to the crime and all of the deceptions by Tess are laid bare and forgiven.

Cast
Wanda Hawley as Tess Haggard
Guy Edward Hearn as David Haggard
Charles A. Stevenson as Harvey Mattison
Casson Ferguson as Arthur Sinclair
Lloyd Whitlock as Larry Steffens
George Siegmann as	Mark Potts
E. Alyn Warren as Peteer Vanetti 
Charles K. French as Police Commissioner Rogers

References

External links

1922 films
American mystery films
1922 mystery films
Paramount Pictures films
American black-and-white films
Films directed by Thomas N. Heffron
American silent feature films
Lost American films
1922 lost films
1920s English-language films
1920s American films
Silent mystery films